Dambiijavyn Terbaatar (born 1 November 1968) is a Mongolian international footballer. He made his first appearance for the Mongolia national football team in 2000.

References

1968 births
Mongolian footballers
Mongolia international footballers
Living people

Association football midfielders
Mongolian National Premier League players